Kyle Donahue is an American politician. A Democrat, he serves as a member of the Pennsylvania House of Representatives for the 113th district after his election in 2023.

Career 
Donahue previously served on the City Council for Scranton.

References 

Democratic Party members of the Pennsylvania House of Representatives
Politicians from Scranton, Pennsylvania
21st-century American politicians

Pennsylvania city council members

1986 births

Living people